CB Ciudad de Logroño is a team of handball based in Logroño, Spain. It plays in Liga ASOBAL.

History

The club was founded in 2003. Since 2006, he has been playing in the Spanish first division, the Liga ASOBAL. In the 2008/09 season, the team took 7th place, so it was able to start in the international field for the first time: the EHF Cup. In the 2012/13 first-class season, the team took 3rd place in the league and was thus allowed to start in the EHF Champions League for the first time.

Crest, colours, supporters

Naming history

Kits

Sports Hall information

Name: – Palacio de los Deportes de La Rioja
City: – Logroño
Capacity: – 3809
Address: – Av. del Moncalvillo, 2, 26008, Logroño, Spain

Team

Current squad 

Squad for the 2022–23 season

Technical staff
 Head Coach:  Miguel Ángel Velasco
 Assistant Coach:  José Ignacio Martínez Castillejo

Transfers

Transfers for the 2022–23 season

Joining 
  Mahamadou Keita (LW) from  S.L. Benfica
  Juan Palomino Morón (LB) from  FC Barcelona
  Álvaro Preciado Ramos (CB) from  BM Cisne
  Javier García López (LP) from  BM Villa de Aranda

Leaving 
  Leonardo Terçariol (GK) to  BM Huesca
  Leonardo Domenech de Almeida (LP) to  Ángel Ximénez Puente Genil
  Agustín Casado (CB) to  MT Melsungen
  Tomás Moreira (LP) to  PAUC Handball
  Mario Dorado (LW) to  CB Cangas
  Ernesto Goñi Macua (LB) to  Helvetia Anaitasuna
  Leonardo Dutra (LB) to  RK Vardar

Previous squads

Retired numbers

Honours
Copa del Rey: 0
Runners-up: 2013, 2017
Supercopa ASOBAL: 0
Runners-up: 2013

Season by season

European record

EHF ranking

Former club members

Notable former players

  Gurutz Aguinagalde (2005–2018)
  Garcia Alberto Aguirrezabalaga (2007–2009)
  Marc Amargant (2006–2011)
  Jon Belaustegui (2007–2009)
  Pablo Cacheda (2014–2018)
  Agustín Casado (2020–2022)
  David Cuartero Sánchez (2012–2013)
  Juan del Arco (2017–2019)
  Alex Dujshebaev (2010–2012)
  Ángel Fernández Pérez (2013–2018)
  Rubén Garabaya (2010–2018)
  Javier García Rubio (2014–2017)
  Juanín García (2014–2015)
  Imanol Garciandia (2015–2020)
  Gedeón Guardiola (2008–2009)
  Isaías Guardiola (2005–2010)
  Sergey Hernández (2018–2020)
  Víctor Hugo López (2010–2013)
  Cristian Malmagro (2015)
  Josep Masachs (2006–2008, 2013–2014)
  Niko Mindegía (2011–2013)
  Carlos Molina (2015–2017)
  Ángel Montoro (2016–2018)
  Pablo Paredes (2017–2018)
  Iñaki Peciña (2016–2017)
  Pedro Rodríguez Álvarez (2011–2016)
  Albert Rocas (2014–2018)
  Miguel Sánchez-Migallón (2013–2021)
  Joan Saubich (2013)
  Antonio Serradilla (2020–)
  Nikola Prce (2011–2012)
  Ales Abrao Silva (2009–2013)
  Gabriel Ceretta (2019–2021)
  Fábio Chiuffa (2017–2018)
  Leonardo Domenech de Almeida (2013–2015)
  Leonardo Dutra (2021–2022)
  Oswaldo Guimarães (2020–2021)
  Rudolph Hackbarth (2019–2021)
  Haniel Langaro (2016–2017)
  Arthur Patrianova (2013–2014)
  Thiagus Petrus (2012–2015)
  Leonardo Terçariol (2021–2022)
  Marco Oneto (2007–2009)
  Délcio Pina (2020–2021)
  Rafael Capote (2011–2013)
  Julio Fis (2007–2008)
  Jorge Pabán (2012–2014)
  Jakub Krupa (2017–2018)
  Mohammad Sanad (2016–2017)
  Bálint Fekete (2018–2019)
  Patrik Ligetvári (2019–2020)
  Gianluca Dapiran (2019–2020)
  Aidenas Malašinskas (2013–2015)
  Aco Jonovski (2015)
  Naumče Mojsovski (2007–2008)
  Håvard Tvedten (2006–2008)
  Pavel Bashkin (2008–2010)
  Ognjen Backovič (2006–2007)
  Gregor Lorger (2009–2011)
  Rok Praznik (2010–2011)
  Marko Ćuruvija (2011–2013)
  Vanja Ilić (2018–2019)
  Nikola Kojić (2010–2011)
  Lazar Kukić (2017–2020)
  Stefan Terzić (2015–2016)
  Thomas Gautschi (2008–2009)
  Richard Kappelin (2015–2017)
  Johan Petersson (2007)
  Philip Stenmalm (2014–2016)

Former coaches

References

External links
  
 

Sport in Logroño
Spanish handball clubs
Liga ASOBAL teams
Sports teams in La Rioja (Spain)